Agen La Garenne Airport or Aérodrome d'Agen - La Garenne  is an airport located in Le Passage and 3 km southwest of Agen, both communes of the Lot-et-Garonne département in the Nouvelle-Aquitaine région of France.

Airlines and destinations 

As of 19 June 2020, there are no regular commercial passenger flights as Chalair stopped flying the PSO route to Paris-Orly.

Traffic and statistics

References

External links 
  
 Aérodrome d'Agen - La Garenne (Union des Aéroports Français) 
 
 

Airports in Nouvelle-Aquitaine
Agen